
Société des Avions Blanchard, also known as Société Constructions Aéronautiques Blanchard was a French aircraft manufacturer of the 1920s, most remembered for their large reconnaissance flying boat for the French Navy, the Brd.1. The firm also built a seaplane to contest the Schneider Cup, the BB.2 but withdrew it before the race.

Aircraft
Blanchard BB-1
Blanchard BB.2
Blanchard Brd.1

References
 

Defunct aircraft manufacturers of France